Anasa andresii is a species of leaf-footed bug in the family Coreidae. It is found in the Caribbean Sea, Central America, North America, and South America.

References

Articles created by Qbugbot
Insects described in 1857
Coreini